Maisie, also spelt Maisy, or occasionally Maizie, Maysie, or Mazie, is a feminine given name. It is the pet form of Mairead, which is the Scottish Gaelic equivalent of Margaret. The -ie is a diminutive suffix used in Scottish as well as Northern England English.

Margaret is derived via French and Latin from  meaning "pearl". The Greek is borrowed from Indo-Iranian languages (Persian).

People

Maisie
Maisie Adam (born 1994), English stand-up comedian, writer and actress
Maisie Carr (1912–1988), Australian botanist
Maisie Gay (1883–1945), English actress
Maisie Maxwell (1876–1977), Australian film actress
Maisie McDaniel (1939–2008), Irish singer
Maisie Methuen (born 2001), English artistic gymnast
Maisie Mosco (1924–2011), English writer
Maisie Nankivell (born 1999), Australian rules football player
Maisie Peters (born 2000), English musician
Maisie Potter (born 1997), Welsh snowboarder
Maisie Renault (1907–2003), French resistance fighter
Maisie Richardson-Sellers (born 1992), English actress
Maisie Ringham (1924–2016), British trombonist
Maisie Shiell (1916–2008), Canadian anti-nuclear activist
Maisie Smith (born 2001), English actress
Maisie Summers-Newton (born 2002), British swimmer
Maisie Trollette (born 1933), British drag queen
Maisie Ward (1889–1975), British writer, publisher and speaker
Maisie Williams (born 1997), British actress

Maisy
Maisy Barker, English footballer
Maisy Collis (born 2000), English footballer
Maisy Gibson (born 1996), Australian cricketer
Maisy Ma (born 1999), Hong Kong figure skater

Maysie
Maysie Bestall-Cohen (born 1945), New Zealand modelling agent and fashion show producer
Maysie Coucher Greig (1901–1971), Australian writer of romantic novels
Maysie Hoy, Canadian actress and film editor
Maysie Webb (1923–2005), British librarian and museum executive

Mazie
Mazie E. Clemens (1890s–1952), American journalist and WWI war correspondent
Mazie Follette (fl 1901–1911), American dancer
Mazie Gordon-Phillips (1896-1964), American movie theater owner
Mazie Hirono (born 1947), American junior senator from Hawaii
Mazie King (1888-1968), American toe dancer, vaudeville performer
Mazie Turner (1954–2014), Australian artist
Mazie O. Tyson (1900-1975), American geographer

Maizie
Maizie Williams (born 1951), British model and singer

Fictional characters

Maisie
Maisie, in the British comic strip The Perishers (1959–2006)
Maisie, the character loved by the protagonist in Rudyard Kipling's first novel, The Light That Failed (1891)
Maisie, protagonist in the Rosa Mulholland novel Our Sister Maisie (1907)
Maisie Dobbs, protagonist in an ongoing series of detective novels by Jacqueline Winspear, from 2003
Maisie Farange, the protagonist in the Henry James novel What Maisie Knew (1897)
Maisie, the same character in the 2012 film of the novel, played by Onata Aprile
Maisie Lockwood, a supporting character in the Jurassic Park film franchise
Maisie MacKenzie, the kitten in the 1980s Scottish children's books by Aileen Paterson
Maisie Mac, the same character in the 2000-2003 British animated TV series Meeow! (Gaelic version: Meusaidh) 
Maisie Raine, the title character of the eponymous 1998-1999 British TV drama series
Maisie Ravier, character played by Ann Sothern in ten films and a radio show (1939–1953) and by Janis Paige in a 1960 telemovie
Maisie Wylde, in the British TV soap opera Emmerdale

Other spellings
Maisy Gibbons from Desperate Housewives
Maisy Mouse, the titular character of the children's book series by Lucy Cousins and its animated adaptation
Maizy Russell, a character in the 1989 film Uncle Buck

See also
 Macy (given name)
 Maisie (disambiguation)
 USS Maysie (SP-930)

References

Given names derived from gemstones
Scottish feminine given names
Hypocorisms